Theeya Velai Seiyyanum Kumaru is a 2013 Indian Tamil-language romantic comedy film co-produced and directed by Sundar C. and produced by Khushbu. The film stars Siddharth, Hansika Motwani, and Santhanam. The film was partially reshot in Telugu as Something Something with Brahmanandam replacing Santhanam and a different supporting cast. The film released on 14 June 2013 to positive reviews, performing well at the box office and becoming a commercial success.

Plot 
Kumar is a software engineer who lives in a joint family. All of the marriages in his family have been love marriages for generations. He, however, swears off girls and love because of bad experiences in his childhood and teenage years. One day, he falls in love with Sanjana, a new employee in his office. Unable to convey his feelings, he seeks the help of Mokia (Premji in Telugu), a man who earns a living by helping men impress their lovers. Mokia teaches him to be more assertive and flirtatious. He makes Kumar spread the rumour that Sanjana is seeing her boss, George. As a result, Sanjana stops spending time with George. George then asks her to be his girlfriend, coincidentally when Kumar was planning to confess his love for Sanjana. She accepts, leaving Kumar heartbroken. Mokia then intervenes and breaks up George and Sanjana. Sanjana and Kumar finally get together but Mokia tries to break them apart after he finds out it's his sister he has been helping Kumar with. Then, Kumar admits to Sanjana that he manipulated her feelings but then seeks her forgiveness. Then they get back together, with the acceptance of Mokia who sees Kumar's true love for Sanjana.

Cast 

 Siddharth as Kumar
 Santhanam as Mokia/Sathish
 Hansika Motwani as Sanjana  
 Ganesh Venkatraman as George
 RJ Balaji as Karna
 Manobala as Pencil Maama/Cone Ice
 Chitra Lakshmanan as Kunchithapadam
 Devadarshini as Kumar's sister
 Bosskey as Kumar's brother-in-law
 Vidyullekha Raman as Vidhya
 Vichu Vishwanath as Boss
 George Vishnu as Ragavendra Rao
 Nalini as Annakilli
 Thalapathy Dinesh as Annakili's brother
 Jennifer as Maya
 Iswarya Menon as Harini
 Sriranjini as Sathish and Sanjana's mother
 Rethika Srinivas as Rekha Mohan. HR Manager
 George Maryan as Police officer
 Bava Lakshmanan as Annakili's sidekick
 Pei Krishnan as Annakili's sidekick
 Meena Kumari as Kumar's sister
 Priyanka Nalkari as Divyasree
 Balaji K. Mohan as Kumar's Brother-in-law
 Kannika Ravi as Saindhavi
 Delhi Ganesh as Bombay Ganesh (special appearance)
 John Vijay as Military Colonel (special appearance)
 Vishal as himself (special appearance)
 Samantha Ruth Prabhu (special appearance)
 Khushbu (special appearance in the song "Thiruttu Pasanga")
 Karunakaran (special appearance)
 Sundar C. (special appearance)

Telugu version
 Brahmanandam as Premji
 Venu Madhav as Cone Ice Bava
 Sudha as Premji and Sanjana's mother
 Gautam Raju as Police officer
 Rana Daggubati as himself (special appearance)

Production 
In January 2013, Sundar C. announced that he would collaborate with UTV Motion Pictures for another film after the success of Kalakalappu. The film was launched on 21 March 2013 in Hyderabad. Siddharth and Hansika are the lead pair of the film after the Telugu film Oh My Friend. The film's title Theeya Velai Seiyyanum Kumaru was derived from a dialogue from Pudhupettai, later popularised by Boss Engira Bhaskaran. Shooting took place in Chennai.

Soundtrack 

C. Sathya composed the music for this film; the soundtrack features six tracks.

Release 

The satellite rights of the film were secured by STAR Vijay. The film was given a U certificate by the Censor Board without cuts. The film and its Telugu version was released simultaneously with Thillu Mullu on 14 June 2013. TVSK has acquired 460 screens in Tamil Nadu, 80 screens in overseas markets across Singapore, Sri Lanka, Malaysia and USA and 60 screens across Kerala and Karnataka.

Box office 
The film had good start at the box office collected  in the end of the first week itself and in Telugu, the film grossed  Total  at the box office. The positive word of mouth helped the film. The film had a total Worldwide gross  at the box office. The film declared "Blockbuster Hit" at the box office in Tamil. The film is also listed in most successful films of 2013. The film completed 100 days in 100 centers.

Reception 
This Tamil version received positive reviews from critics and audience. Moviecrow rated it 3/5 stating that "TVSK works because of Sundar C.'s rich experience and ability to mix various comedy elements and commercial formula with strong backing from a bevy of lead actors and comedians". Rediff wrote:"Theeya Velai Seyyanum Kumaru fails on many counts, the primary being the lead actors and their lackluster performance, the film is still quite boring and predictable". In wrote:"Overall, TVSK is an average rom-com with few good laughs". Behindwoods wrote:"To sum up, TVSK is bound to continue the long-lasting trend of well-made comedy movies striking it big at the box-office". Baradwaj Rangan of the Hindu wrote "Theeya Velai Seiyyanum Kumaru at least has better one-liners, borderline surreal non sequiturs — and all of them are entrusted with RJ Balaji...Santhanam, in comparison, comes off a tad stale, with his now-patented mix of alliteration and rhyme."

The Telugu version received mixed to positive reviews. The Hindu wrote that "Something Something oscillates between being hilarious to ridiculous, backed by good performances by Siddharth, Hansika and Brahmanandam". idlebrain.com gave a review of rating 3/5 stating "Something Something is a romantic comedy that features Brahmanandam in a full length character. It is one of those films in which the character suits Siddharth very well. The scenes and thread featuring Brahmanandam is the lifeline of the movie. On a whole, Something Something works because of Brahmanandam."

References

External links 
 

2013 films
Films shot in Chennai
Films shot in Telangana
Indian multilingual films
2013 romantic comedy films
Indian romantic comedy films
Films directed by Sundar C.
2010s Tamil-language films
2010s Telugu-language films
Films scored by C. Sathya
UTV Motion Pictures films
2013 multilingual films
Films shot in Japan